Shipping insurance is a service which may reimburse senders whose parcels are lost, stolen, and/or damaged in transit.

In Canada and the US, shipping insurance is offered by postal services, courier companies, and shipping-insurance companies. Not all insurers will insure all goods. For example, postal services will not insure certain economy-class parcels, though third-party insurers often will.

It is possible to ship a parcel with insurance but without parcel tracking service.  This can be a sensible thing to do. Shipping insurance is normally less expensive than tracking. Also, if a parcel is damaged in transit, tracking may be unhelpful, but shipping insurance may reimburse the sender in full.

First-party shipping-insurance services offered by postal services and courier companies may have many more restrictions than third-party shipping-insurance services. First-party insurance services may not pay out on claims unless the item was packed very carefully. Claimants also may need to provide proof of an item's value.

When practical, self-insurance is normally more economical than paying for insurance; see Insurance#Limited consumer benefits.

See also 
 Cargo insurance
 UPS Capital
 Aviation insurance
 Lost in transit scam

References

Types of insurance